Walter Fritsch (11 December 1911 – 18 July 2005) was a Chilean hurdler. He competed in the men's 400 metres hurdles at the 1936 Summer Olympics.

References

External links
 

1911 births
2005 deaths
Athletes (track and field) at the 1936 Summer Olympics
Chilean male hurdlers
Olympic athletes of Chile
Place of birth missing